The following is a list of recordings which have been worked on by musician, songwriter, and record producer L.A. Reid.

Discography

1977
"Third Rock" - Pure Essence (by then known simply as Essence, as featured on WEBN - The Album Project #2) - Drums, Percussion

1983
Street Beat - The Deele - Drums, Vocals (Background)

1985
Material Thangz - The Deele - Percussion, Drums [LinnDrum, Oberheim DMX], Producer, Programming

1986
Lovers – Babyface - Mixing, Producer, Composer
Daydreamin' - Dynasty - Drums [LinnDrum], Percussion, Producer

1987
Circumstantial Evidence - Shalamar - Drums, Programming
Just Gets Better with Time - The Whispers - Drums, Percussion, Producer
Pebbles – Pebbles - Producer, Vocals (Background), Musician
Eyes of a Stranger - The Deele - Producer, Musician (Drums)

1988
Don't Be Cruel - Bobby Brown - Producer
Karyn White - Karyn White - Vocals (Background), Drums, Producer, Percussion
Forever Your Girl - Paula Abdul - Producer, Percussion Programming, Drums [Linn LM-1], Composer
The Mac Band featuring the McCampbell Brothers - The Mac Band - Drums [Linn 9000], Producer
The Lover in Me - Sheena Easton - Producer, Percussion, Drums [Linn 9000], Mixing, Composer
Dial My Heart, Lucky Charm, & A Little Romance - The Boys - Producer
(Tell Me) Do You Want My Love - Dynasty - Producer

1989
2300 Jackson Street – The Jacksons - Producer, Composer, Mixing, Drums, Percussion, Programming
Every Little Step - Bobby Brown - Producer, Composer, Remixing, Programming
Ghostbusters II - Various Artists - Producer, Composer, Drums [Linn 9000]
Tender Lover – Babyface - Percussion, Programming, Stylist, Executive Producer, Producer, Drums [Linn 9000], Composer
After 7 - After 7 - Technical Assistance, Producer, Programming, Mixing, Drums [Linn 9000], Percussion, Executive Producer
Rock Wit'cha - Bobby Brown - Producer, Remixing, Multi Instruments

1990
Always – Pebbles - Vocal Arrangement, Executive Producer, Rhythm Arrangements, Drums, Remixing, Mixing, Percussion, Vocals (Background), Composer, Producer
The Boys - The Boys - Mixing
Dance!...Ya Know It! - Bobby Brown - Remixing, Producer, Composer
I'm Your Baby Tonight - Whitney Houston - Percussion, Mixing, Rhythm Arrangements, Drums, Vocal Arrangement, Producer, Rhythm, Vocals, Arranger
Johnny Gill - Johnny Gill - Drums, Producer, Executive Producer, Mixing, Percussion
Shut Up and Dance: Dance Mixes - Paula Abdul - Producer

1991
Damian Dame - Damian Dame - Producer, Percussion, Vocal Arrangement, Drum Programming, Reissue Producer, Executive Producer, Mixing, Rhythm Arrangements
You Said - Jermaine Jackson - Programming, Drum Programming, Mixing, Executive Producer, Remixing, Producer, Percussion

1992
Bobby - Bobby Brown - Multi Instruments, Producer, Composer
Bodyguard - Whitney Houston/Original Soundtrack - Producer, Composer, Instruments
Takin' My Time - After 7 - Drum Programming, Drums
Ooooooohhh... On the TLC Tip – TLC - Executive Producer, Drum Programming, Percussion, Mixing, Composer
Boomerang - Original Soundtrack - Executive Producer, Producer, Percussion, Composer, Drum Programming, Drums
1746DCGA30035 - Highland Place Mobsters - Executive Producer, Producer, Instruments

1993
Remixes N the Key of B - Bobby Brown - Producer, Remixing
Provocative - Johnny Gill - Producer, Drums
Poetic Justice - Original Soundtrack - Producer
Hootie Mack - Bell Biv DeVoe - Multi Instruments, Producer
Toni Braxton - Toni Braxton - Producer, Executive Producer, Drum Programming, Drums, Mixing
For the Cool in You – Babyface - Producer, Drum Programming
LaFace Family Christmas [Arista] - La Face Artists - Producer, Drums, Drum Programming, Executive Producer

1994
Tribute to Curtis Mayfield [Warner Bros.] - Various Artists - Mixing, Percussion, Producer, Drum Programming
Greatest Hits (1980-1994) - Aretha Franklin - Drum Programming, Producer
Southernplayalisticadillacmuzik – OutKast - Executive Producer
II - Boyz II Men - Producer
Usher – Usher - Executive Producer
CrazySexyCool – TLC - Executive Producer

1995
Many Ways - Usher Raymond - Executive Producer
Take a Dip - A Few Good Men - Drum Programming, Executive Producer, Mixing, Drums, Percussion
Brainchild - Society of Soul - Executive Producer
Words - Tony Rich - Executive Producer
Soul Food - Goodie Mob - Executive Producer

1996
In the Hood - Donell Jones - Executive Producer
Knocks Me Off My Feet [#1] - Donell Jones - Executive Producer
Knocks Me Off My Feet [#2] - Donell Jones - Executive Producer
Last Night [US #2] - Az Yet - Executive Producer
My Heart - Donell Jones - Executive Producer
Rhythm of the Games: 1996 Olympic Games Album - Various Artists - Executive Producer
Secrets - Toni Braxton - Vocal Arrangement, Executive Producer, Vocal Arrangement
You're Makin' Me High [US] - Toni Braxton - Executive Producer
ATLiens – OutKast - Executive Producer
Az Yet - Az Yet - Executive Producer
Un-Break My Heart - Toni Braxton - Vocal Arrangement, Executive Producer

1997
After 12, Before 6 - Sam Salter - Executive Producer
I Don't Want To [#1] - Toni Braxton - Executive Producer
What About Us [#1] – Total - Executive Producer
My Way – Usher - Executive Producer
Nice & Slow [#1] – Usher - Executive Producer
It's on Tonight - Sam Salter - Executive Producer
We're Not Making Love No More - Dru Hill - Executive Producer

1998
They Don't Dance No Mo''' - Goodie Mob - Executive ProducerNice & Slow [#2] – Usher - Executive ProducerHymns - Corey Glover - Executive ProducerStill Standing - Goodie Mob - Executive ProducerBirdseye - Tony Rich - Executive Producer

1999FanMail – TLC - Executive ProducerShanice – Shanice - Executive ProducerLive – Usher - Executive Producer, ComposerR&B: From Doo Wop to Hip Hop - Various Artists - ProducerUltimate Grammy Box: From the Recording Academy's Collection - Various Artists - Producer

2000Can't Take Me Home - P!nk - ProducerGreatest Hits - Whitney Houston - Producer, ComposerGreatest Hits – Pebbles - Composer, Drums, PercussionHeat - Toni Braxton - ProducerShaft [2000] - Original Soundtrack - ProducerBest of Bell Biv DeVoe - Bell Biv DeVoe - ProducerGreatest Hits - Paula Abdul - ComposerSpanish Guitar [Import CD #1] - Toni Braxton - ProducerCollection of His Greatest Hits – Babyface - Drums, Drum Programming, Percussion, ProducerCould I Have This Kiss Forever [Australia CD] - Whitney Houston - ProducerPlatinum Christmas - Various Artists - ProducerPlatinum Collection [La Face] - Various Artists - Executive Producer, Vocal ArrangementSoul Food - Original TV Soundtrack - Executive Producer

2001Love Songs – Babyface - Drums, Producer, PercussionSupernova - Lisa "Left Eye" Lopes - Executive ProducerFace2Face – Babyface - Executive ProducerWeekend - Kenny Lattimore - Executive Producer, ComposerSnowflakes - Toni Braxton - Drums, Producer, Executive ProducerEven in Darkness - Dungeon Family - Executive ProducerSo Blu - Blu Cantrell - Executive ProducerCrown Royal - Run-D.M.C. - Executive ProducerLove, Whitney - Whitney Houston - Executive Producer, Vocal Arrangement, ProducerM!ssundaztood - P!nk - Executive ProducerBig Boi and Dre Present...Outkast – OutKast - Executive ProducerBridget Jones's Diary, Vol. 2 - Various Artists - Producer, Executive Producer

2002Cee-Lo Green and His Perfect Imperfections - Cee-Lo Green - Executive ProducerUltimate Collection - Johnny Gill - ProducerDon't Let Me Get Me [Australia CD] - P!nk - Executive ProducerLet Go - Avril Lavigne - Executive ProducerLife Goes On - Donell Jones - Executive ProducerFull Circle - Boyz II Men - Executive ProducerLeft of Self-Centered - Butch Walker - Executive ProducerComplicated - Avril Lavigne - Executive ProducerLast Night [US #1] - Az Yet - Executive ProducerWhatchulookinat - Whitney Houston - Executive Producer20th Century Masters - The Millennium Collection: Motown 1980s, Vol. 2 - Various Artists - Producer, ComposerParadise - Kenny G - Executive Producer3D – TLC - Executive ProducerGirl Talk – TLC - Executive ProducerGame of Love [Australia CD] – Santana - Executive ProducerWishes: A Holiday Album - Kenny G - Executive ProducerMore Than a Woman - Toni Braxton - Executive ProducerFamily Portrait - P!nk - Executive ProducerJust Whitney - Whitney Houston - Executive Producer

2003Things That Lovers Do - Kenny Lattimore - Executive ProducerMy So-Called Life - From Zero - Executive ProducerEssential Babyface – Babyface - Producer, Percussion, DrumsUltimate Kenny G - Kenny G - Executive ProducerSo Damn Happy - Aretha Franklin - Executive ProducerSpeakerboxxx/The Love Below – OutKast - Executive ProducerUltimate Toni Braxton - Toni Braxton - Live Mixing, Producer, ComposerTry This - P!nk - Executive ProducerBest of After 7 - After 7 - Composer

2004The Greatest Hits of TLC – TLC - Compilation Producer, Audio ProductionConfessions [Special Edition] – Usher - Executive Producer

2005Pleasure & Pain – 112 - Executive ProducerBreathe Again: Toni Braxton at Her Best - Toni Braxton - Composer20th Century Masters - The Millennium Collection: The Best of Bobby Brown - Bobby Brown - Producer, Composer, Audio ProductionLet's Get It: Thug Motivation 101 - Young Jeezy - Executive ProducerI'll Make Love to You - Boyz II Men - Producer, ComposerBest of Soul Love: Luther Vandross/Marvin Gaye - Various Artists - Composer20th Century Masters - The DVD Collection: The Best of Bobby Brown - Bobby Brown - Composer, ProducerOther Side of Cool – Babyface - Remixing, ComposerThe Emancipation of Mimi - Mariah Carey - Executive Producer

2006Definitive Collection - Bobby Brown - Composer, ProducerGold - Gladys Knight - ComposerCollection [3 Disc] - Toni Braxton - Vocal Arrangement, ProducerUltimate Collection – Shalamar - Producer, ComposerComing Home - Lionel Richie - Executive ProducerBobby - Original Soundtrack - Audio Production, ProducerKingdom Come - Jay-Z - Executive Producer

2007Essential Toni Braxton - Toni Braxton - Composer, ProducerI Am - Chrisette Michele - Audio Production, Executive ProducerUltimate Collection - Whitney Houston - ProducerAmerican Gangster - Jay-Z - Executive ProducerSuper Hits - The Jackson 5 - Composer, ProducerSong for You: Live - Whitney Houston - Composer

2008Super Hits – Babyface - Producer, ComposerE=MC2  - Mariah Carey - Executive ProducerYear of the Gentleman - Ne-Yo - Executive ProducerNas – Nas - Executive Producer, Audio ProductionRecession - Young Jeezy - Executive ProducerTender Lover/For the Cool in You – Babyface - Percussion, Drums, Stylist, Producer, Composer

2009From the Heart – Babyface - ProducerThis Is the One - Utada - Executive ProducerCan You Feel It: The Jacksons Collection - The Jackson 5 - ComposerGold - Bobby Brown - Producer, RemixingJust Go - Lionel Richie - Executive ProducerWhitney Houston Smooth Jazz Tribute - Various Artists - ComposerIn Love & War - Amerie - Executive ProducerLive from the Royal Albert Hall - The Killers - Executive ProducerMy World - Justin Bieber - Executive ProducerRated R – Rihanna - Executive Producer

2010My World 2.0 - Justin Bieber - Executive ProducerLoud - Rihanna - Executive ProducerMy Beautiful Dark Twisted Fantasy - Kanye West - Executive ProducerLibra Scale – Ne-Yo - Executive Producer

2011Love? - Jennifer Lopez - Executive Producer

2013Love and War - Tamar Braxton - Executive Producer
Ciara - Ciara - Executive Producer
Side Effects of You - Fantasia - Composer
Avril Lavigne - Avril Lavigne - Executive Producer
20 - TLC - Executive Producer

2014
Xscape - Michael Jackson - Executive Producer, Composer, Drums, Percussions, Vocal Producer, Compiler
Think Like a Man Too - Mary J. Blige - Executive Producer

2015
Calling All Lovers - Tamar Braxton - Executive Producer

References

Production discographies
Rhythm and blues discographies
Hip hop discographies